Mark Lee Ping-bing (born 8 August 1954) is a Taiwanese cinematographer, photographer and author with over 70 films and 21 international awards to his credit including 2 Glory Of The Country Awards from the Government Information Office of Taiwan and the president of Taiwan's Light Of The Cinema Award. Lee began his film career in 1977 and in 1985 he started his prolific collaboration with Taiwanese filmmaker Hou Hsiao-hsien. Known best for his use of natural lighting utilizing real film and graceful camera movement, Lee received the Grand Technical Prize at the Cannes Film Festival in 2000 for In the Mood for Love. A member of the Academy of Motion Picture Arts and Sciences, Lee was honored with nominations by the American Society of Cinematographers for its 2014 First Annual Spotlight Award for Best Cinematography for his work on the 2012 film Renoir and by the French Academy of Cinema Arts for a Cesar Award for Best Cinematography in 2014 also for the film Renoir.

In 2009, Taiwanese director Chiang Hsiu-chiung and Kwan Pun Leung made a documentary about Lee entitled Let The Wind Carry Me.

Also in 2009, a book of Lee's photography entitled A Poet of Light and Shadow was published.

In November 2021, he succeeded director Ang Lee as head of the Taipei Golden Horse Film Festival Executive Committee. The Chair leads the Committee for a two-year term and may be re-elected once.

Filmography

2021: Looking for a Lady With Fangs and a Moustache
2020: Mo Er Dao Ga
2019: Somewhere Winter
2019: Ye yi ji ye
2018: Us and Them
2017: Seventy-Seven Days
2017: Love Education
2017: Endangered Species
2016: Eternity
2016: Crosscurrent
2015: The Last Women Standing
2015: The Assassin
2015: The Queens
2015: Somewhere Only We Know
2015: Lost and Love
2014: (Sex) Appeal
2013: The Rooftop
2012: Renoir
2012: Love
2012: Black & White Episode 1: The Dawn of Assault
2011: Mural
2010: Once Upon a Time in Tibet
2010: Norwegian Wood
2010: Love in Disguise
2009: Rail Truck
2009: Murderer
2009: Air Doll
2009: Detours to Paradise (Sincerely Yours)
2008: Claustrophobia
2008: Afterwards
2007: Secret
2007: Flight of the Red Balloon
2007: The Sun Also Rises
2007: The Matrimony
2006: After This Our Exile
2006: Tripping
2006: Reflections
2005: Dragon Eye Congee: A Dream of Love
2005: Spring Snow
2005: Three Times
2004: Letter from an Unknown Woman
2003: Café Lumière 
2003: Inquiétudes 
2002: Springtime in a Small Town
2002: Youling renjian II: Gui wei ren jian
2002: Princess D
2002: Time 4 Hope
2001: Millennium Mambo
2001: Forever and Ever
2000: In the Mood for Love
2000: Days of Tomorrow
2000: The Vertical Ray of the Sun
2000: Tempting Heart
1998: Flowers of Shanghai
1998: Chivalrous Legend
1997: Task Force
1997: Eighteen Springs
1996: Fei tian
1996: Buddha Bless America
1996: Goodbye South, Goodbye
1995: Modern Republic
1995: Whatever Will Be, Will Be
1995: Summer Snow
1994: Wing Chun
1994: Heaven and Earth
1993: The Legend II
1993: The Puppetmaster
1992: China Heat
1991: My American Grandson
1990: Whampoa Blues
1990: Tiger Cage 2
1989: The Dull Ice Flower
1989: City Kids 1989
1988: Runaway Blues
1988: Jiang hu jie ban ren
1987: Strawman
1987: Hei pi yu bai ya
1987: Dust in the Wind
1985: Papa's Spring
1985: The Time to Live and the Time to Die
1985: Run Away
1984: Amazing Stories
1982: Portrait of a Fanatic

Awards and nominations

Awards
2010: The Asian Film Award (China), Norwegian Wood — Best Cinematographer
2008: National Award For Arts (Taiwan), Lifetime Achievement 
2008 Golden Deer Award Changchun Film Festival Award (China), The Sun Also Rises — Best Cinematography
2006 Japan Academy Prize, Spring Snow — Best Cinematography
2005 The 25th Golden Rooster Award, Letter From An Unknown Woman — Best Cinematography
2005 The 14th Golden Rooster and Hundred Flowers Film Festival Award, Letter From An Unknown Woman — Best Cinematography
2001 The New York Film Critics Circle Award, In The Mood For Love — Best Cinematography
2001 American Film Institute Award, In The Mood For Love — Best Cinematography
2001 Boston Society of Film Critics (BSFC) Award, In The Mood For Love — Best Cinematography (shared 2nd place)
2001 Golden Horse Film Award (Taiwan), Millennium Mambo — Best Cinematography
2001 The Government Information Office of Taiwan, In The Mood For Love — Glory Of The Country Award
2000 Award From The President of Taiwan, In The Mood For Love — The Light Of The Cinema Award
2000 Cannes Film Festival, In The Mood For Love — Grand Technical Prize
2000 Golden Horse Film Award (Taiwan), In The Mood For Love — Best Cinematography
2000 Asia Pacific Film Festival Award (China), In The Mood For Love — Best Cinematography
1995 Golden Horse Film Award (Taiwan), Summer Snow — Best Cinematography
1993 Golden Horse Film Award (Taiwan), The Puppetmaster — Best Cinematography
1988 The Government Information Office of Taiwan, Dust In The Wind Glory Of The Country Award
1986 Three Continents Film Festival Award (France), Dust In The Wind — Best Cinematography
1985 Asia Pacific Film Festival Award (China), Run Away — Best Cinematography*

Nominations
2005 Golden Horse Film Award (Taiwan), Three Times — Best Cinematography
2002 Hong Kong Film Award, In The Mood For Love — Best Cinematography
1999 Golden Horse Film Award (Taiwan) — Tempting Heart - Best Cinematography
1998 Hong Kong Film Award, Eighteen Springs — Best Cinematography
1990 Asia Pacific Film Festival Award (China), The Dull Ice Flowers — Best Cinematography
1987 Golden Horse Award (Taiwan), Strawman — Best Cinematography
1987 Asia Pacific Film Festival Award (China), Strawman — Best Cinematography

References

External links

 

Taiwanese cinematographers
1954 births
Living people